Vologases IV ( Walagash) was King of Kings of the Parthian Empire from 147 to 191. He was the son of Mithridates V. Vologases spent the early years of his reign re-asserting Parthian control over the Kingdom of Characene. From 161 to 166, he waged war against the Roman Empire; although initially successful, conquering Armenia and Syria, he was eventually pushed back, briefly losing control of the Parthian capitals of Seleucia and Ctesiphon to the Romans. The Romans suffered heavy losses from a plague erupting from Seleucia in 166, forcing them to withdraw. The war ended soon afterward, with Vologases losing most of northern Mesopotamia to the Romans. He died in 191 and was succeeded by his son Vologases V.

Name 
Vologases is the Greek and Latin form of the Parthian Walagaš. The name is also attested in New Persian as Balāsh and Middle Persian as Wardākhsh (also spelled Walākhsh). The etymology of the name is unclear, although Ferdinand Justi proposes that Walagaš, the first form of the name, is a compound of words "strength" (varəda), and "handsome" (gaš or geš in Modern Persian).

Reign

Conquest of Characene
Vologases IV was a son of Mithridates V, who had contended against the ruling Parthian monarch Vologases III for the throne from 129 to 140. Vologases IV staged a coup d'état and succeeded Vologases III in 147, marking the establishment of a new branch of the Arsacid dynasty on the Parthian throne. In 150/51, he defeated the Arsacid ruler of Characene (also known as Mesene), Meredates, and appointed Orabazes II, most likely a relative of his, as the new king of Characene. Vologases IV's forces seized a statue of Heracles, the patron god of the Characenian royalty. The statue was taken to the temple of Apollo in Seleucia, where it was displayed as a demonstration of Vologases IV's victory. A bilingual inscription (Greek and Parthian) was carved on the statue, which recounts Vologases IV's conquest of Characene:

War with the Romans 

When Marcus Aurelius became the new Roman emperor in 161, Vologases IV unexpectedly declared war against the Romans, marking the only time in a Roman-Parthian conflict where the Parthians declared war. Vologases IV invaded Armenia and replaced its Roman client king Sohaemus with his own son Pacorus.

At the same time, an unanticipated Parthian invasion of Syria led to the defeat of the Roman soldiers assigned there. Confident, Vologases IV declined an offer for peace by the Romans in 162. Although the Roman–Parthian War of 161–166 started auspiciously for the Parthians, after the Romans recovered from the first shock and setbacks, they counterattacked, restored Sohaemus to the Armenian throne in 163. Around the same time, the Parthians captured Edessa and installed Wa'el as puppet king. Ma'nu VIII, the legitimate king, was forced to flee to the Roman Empire. The Parthian forces were pushed out of Syria, in 164, and also lost Dura-Europos, which led many Parthian vassal rulers to desert Vologases IV. The Romans laid siege to Edessa in 165; during the siege, the citizens of the city massacred the Parthian garrison and opened its gates to the Romans. The Romans entered the city and restored Ma'nu VIII as ruler of Edessa/Osroene; he also received the epithet Philorhomaios ("Friend of the Romans").

The Parthian capitals of Seleucia and Ctesiphon were captured by the Roman general Avidius Cassius in 165 or 166. Most likely around the same time, Roman legions invaded Media and Adiabene. However, the Romans suffered heavy losses from a plague erupting from Seleucia in 166, forcing them to withdraw. The war ended soon afterward, with Vologases IV losing most of northern Mesopotamia to the Romans.

Later reign
The chronicles do not report unrest or rebellions following the Parthian defeat, which the modern historian Michael Sommer refers to as a "disastrous military setback." This likely indicates that Vologases IV had managed to maintain political stability. The Parthian loss of most of northern Mesopotamia meant that the city of Hatra had now become their new frontier in the west. Hatra was ruled by Parthian vassals who wielded the title of malka (lord). However, due to its now higher strategic importance, Vologases IV elevated the titulature of the ruling Hatran family to that of king, and also allowed them certain ceremonies and traditional ritual oaths. After Sohaemus' death in 180, Vologases IV's son managed to gain the Armenian throne as Vologases II.

The end of Vologases IV's reign was marred by the revolt of Osroes II in 190, who minted coins of himself at Ecbatana in Media. However, Vologases IV's son, Vologases II, succeeded him, and appears to have quickly put down Osroes II, ascending the throne as Vologases V.

Coinage 

On the obverse of his tetradrachms, Vologases IV is portrayed with a domed tiara with a horn on the side. He is also wearing a neck flap covering both of his ears. On the obverse of his drachms, Vologases IV is wearing a tiara without the horn. Vologases IV is the first Parthian monarch to only wear a tiara on his coins. On some of the reverse of Vologases IV's bronze coins, an eagle is depicted, which is associated with the khvarenah, i.e. kingly glory. On the obverse of the coins of the brief ruler of Edessa/Osroene, Wa'el, a portrait of Vologases IV is displayed.

References

Sources 
 
 
 
 
 
 
 
 
 
 
  (2 volumes)

Further reading 
 

|-

191 deaths
2nd-century Parthian monarchs
People of the Roman–Parthian Wars
Year of birth unknown
2nd-century Iranian people